Tur  is a village in the administrative district of Gmina Szubin, within Nakło County, Kuyavian-Pomeranian Voivodeship, in north-central Poland.

The village has a population of 1,040.

History
The oldest known mention of the village comes from 1337, when it was part of the Piast-ruled Kingdom of Poland. Tur was a private village of Polish nobility, administratively located in the Kcynia County in the Kalisz Voivodeship in the Greater Poland Province of the Polish Crown.

During the German occupation of Poland (World War II), in 1940, the Germans expelled several Polish families from the village. Poles were mostly deported to the Kraków District of the General Government (German-occupied central Poland), while their houses and farms were handed over to German colonists as part of the Lebensraum policy. In December 1940, the Germans relocated the Stalag XXI-B prisoner-of-war camp for Allied POWs from Szubin to Tur.

References

Tur